Yom rendered as day in English translations from the Hebrew (יום) and Arabic (يوم)

Yom may refer to:

Hebrew holidays
Yom Tov, in plural Yamim Tovim, literally the Good Day(s), the Jewish holidays 
Yom tov sheni shel galuyot The second festival day in the Diaspora
Yom Kippur, Day of Atonement
Yom Kippur Katan Minor Day of Atonement
Yom Ha'atzmaut, Israeli Independence Day 
Yom HaShoah, full name Yom HaZikaron laShoah ve-laG'vurah, Holocaust and Heroism Remembrance Day
Yom Hazikaron Day of Remembrance for the Fallen Soldier
Yom Yerushalayim Jerusalem Day

Persons
Yom Tov Asevilli (1250–1330), also known as Ritva, medieval rabbi and Halakhist famous for his commentary on the Talmud
Yom-Tov Ehrlich (1914–1990), Hasidic musician, composer, lyricist of Yiddish music
Yom-Tov Lipmann Heller (1579–1654), Bohemian rabbi and Talmudist
Yom-Tov Lipmann-Muhlhausen, controversialist, talmudist, kabbalist and philosopher of the 14th and 15th centuries
Yom Tov Tzahalon (c. 1559–1638), student of Moses ben Joseph di Trani and Moshe Alshich, publisher of a collection of responsa
Yom Sang-seop (1897–1963), South Korean writer

Others
Ha-Yom, Hebrew-language newspaper published from 1886 to mid-1888 from Saint Petersburg, Russia
Yom Kippur War, 1973 Arab–Israeli War
Yom language or Pilapila, and formerly Kiliŋa or Kilir, a Gur language of Benin
Yom River, the main tributary of the Nan River, Thailand
Yom (clarinetist), French musician (French Wikipedia)
Yom (TV series), a 2017 Indian animated television series